is a Japanese former wrestler who competed in the 1984 Summer Olympics, in the 1988 Summer Olympics, and in the 1992 Summer Olympics.

References

External links
 

1965 births
Living people
Olympic wrestlers of Japan
Wrestlers at the 1984 Summer Olympics
Wrestlers at the 1988 Summer Olympics
Wrestlers at the 1992 Summer Olympics
Japanese male sport wrestlers
Olympic silver medalists for Japan
Olympic bronze medalists for Japan
Olympic medalists in wrestling
Asian Games medalists in wrestling
People from Hirosaki
Wrestlers at the 1986 Asian Games
Wrestlers at the 1990 Asian Games
Medalists at the 1992 Summer Olympics
Medalists at the 1984 Summer Olympics
Asian Games silver medalists for Japan
Medalists at the 1986 Asian Games
20th-century Japanese people
21st-century Japanese people
World Wrestling Championships medalists